is a subway station on the  Fukuoka City Subway Nanakuma Line in Sawara-ku, Fukuoka in Japan. Its station symbol is a catfish in violet, the sign of the Kamo Shrine.

Lines 
Fukuoka City Subway
Nanakuma Line

Platforms

Vicinity
Kanakuzu River
Kamo Shrine
Yamada Denki
Fukuoka Dental College
Fukuoka College of Health Sciences

History
February 3, 2005: Opening of the station

References

Railway stations in Japan opened in 2005
Railway stations in Fukuoka Prefecture
Nanakuma Line